Inji Aflatoun (16 April 1924 – 17 April 1989) was an Egyptian painter and activist in the women's movement. She was a "leading spokeswoman for the Marxist-progressive-nationalist-feminist movement in the late 1940s and 1950s", as well as a "pioneer of modern Egyptian art" and "one of the important Egyptian visual artists".

The activist

Aflatoun was born in Cairo in 1924 into a traditional Muslim family she described as "semi-feudal and bourgeois", her father was an entomologist and a landowner, and her mother was a French-trained dress-designer who served in the Egyptian Red Crescent Society women's committee. She discovered Marxism at the Lycée Français du Caire . It was her private art tutor, Kamel el-Telmissany, who introduced her to the life and the struggles of the Egyptian peasants. Al-Timisani was one of the founders of the 'Art and Freedom Group,' a surrealist movement that would have an impact on Aflatoun's development as an artist. In 1942, she joined Iskra, a Communist youth party. After graduating from the Fuad I University in Cairo, she was, with Latifa al-Zayyat, a founding member in 1945 of the Rabitat Fatayat at jami'a wa al ma' ahid (League of University and Institutes' Young Women). The same year she represented the League at the first conference of Women's International Democratic Federation in Paris. She wrote Thamanun milyun imraa ma'ana (Eighty Million Women with Us) in 1948 and Nahnu al-nisa al-misriyyat (We Egyptian Women) in 1949. These popular political pamphlets linked class and gender oppression, connecting both to imperialist oppression. In 1949, she became a founding member of the First Congress of the First Peace Council of Egypt. She joined Harakat ansar al salam (Movement of the Friends of Peace) in 1950. She was arrested and secretly imprisoned during Nasser's roundup of communists in 1959. After her release in 1963, Egypt's Communist party having been dissolved, she devoted most of her time to painting. She later declared: "Nasser, although he put me in prison, was a good patriot."

Painting
During school, Aflatoun liked to paint and her parents encouraged her. Her private art tutor, Kamel el-Telmissany, a leader in an Egyptian Surrealist collective called the Art and Freedom Group, introduced her to surrealist and cubist aesthetics.
Her paintings of that period are influenced by surrealism. She later recalled that people were astonished by her paintings and wondered "why a girl from a rich family was so tormented". She stopped painting from 1946 to 1948, considering that what she was painting no longer corresponded to her feelings. Her interest was later renewed after visiting Luxor, Nubia, and the Egyptian oases. During these trips, she had the opportunity to "penetrate the houses and sketch men and women at work". She studied for a year with the Egyptian-born Swiss artist Margo Veillon During this period, she made solo exhibits in Cairo and Alexandria and showed at the Venice Biennale in 1952 and the São Paulo Art Biennial in 1956. In 1956 she became friends with and was later influenced by the Mexican painter David Alfaro Siqueiros. She was able to continue painting during her imprisonment. Her early prison paintings are portraits, while the later are landscapes. In the years after her liberation, she exhibited in Rome and Paris in 1967, Dresden, East Berlin, Warsaw and Moscow in 1970, Sofia in 1974, Prague in 1975, New Delhi in 1979. Her paintings are filled with "lively brushstrokes of intense color" reminding some observers of Van Gogh or Bonnard. Her art of later years is characterised by an increasing use of large white spaces around her forms. A collection of her works is displayed at the Amir Taz Palace in Cairo. Another collection of her works is showcased at the Barjeel Art Foundation in Sharjah.

Legacy
A Google Doodle on 16 April 2019 commemorated Aflatoun's 95th birth anniversary.

See also
 Aflatoon

References

External links

 Anne Mullin Burnham, 1994, Reflections in Women's Eyes, Saudi Aramco World
 Work by Inji Aflatoun at the Jordan National Gallery of Fine Arts 

1989 deaths
1924 births
20th-century Egyptian painters
20th-century Egyptian women artists
Artists  from Cairo
Feminist artists
Egyptian feminists
20th-century Egyptian women politicians
20th-century Egyptian politicians
Egyptian women's rights activists
Cairo University alumni
Politicians from Cairo